Monkey was a free weekly men's magazine which was published by Dennis Publishing exclusively online and on mobile platforms. It replicated a magazine format, but with video and audio content embedded within both editorial and advertising.

History and profile
Monkey was started in November 2006. Each 48-page issue featured a covergirl shoot and editorial covering cars, sport, humour, entertainment, gadgets, clothes and user-generated content aimed at 16- to 30-year-olds.

In April 2008 the website of Monkey was launched. The magazine was incorporated into a website (kontraband.com) in 2013.

References

External links
 Monkey Mag Official Homepage

2006 establishments in the United Kingdom
2013 disestablishments in the United Kingdom
Men's magazines published in the United Kingdom
Online magazines published in the United Kingdom
Weekly magazines published in the United Kingdom
Defunct magazines published in the United Kingdom
Magazines established in 2006
Magazines disestablished in 2013